Maria Sten is a Danish actress, writer, and filmmaker born and raised in Denmark with Danish, Swedish, and Congolese roots. She was Miss Denmark Universe 2008.

Career 
Sten competed in Miss Supertalent of the World 2011 and was placed in the top 7 women among 50 candidates.

As an actor, Sten played the lead role of Jillian Hope Hodgson in the fourth season of the television show Channel Zero: The Dream Door. She portrayed Liz Tremayne in the DC Universe television series Swamp Thing, which also starred Crystal Reed.

She wrote two episodes of David E. Kelley's series Big Sky, and wrote, directed, and produced the short film Wild Things Run Free. In 2018 Sten was named to the Tracking Board's Young & Hungry List, which showcases the top 100 new writers as voted on by Hollywood's most influential.

In 2022 she starred as the character Frances Neagley in the Amazon Prime Video series Reacher.

Filmography

Film

Television

Web

Producer

References

External links 
 

Danish actresses
Danish film producers
1989 births
Living people
Actresses from Copenhagen